Accuracy International is a British firearms manufacturer based in Portsmouth, Hampshire, England. The company produces the Accuracy International Arctic Warfare series of precision sniper rifles. The company was established in 1978 by British Olympic shooting gold medallist Malcolm Cooper, MBE (1947–2001), Sarah Cooper, Martin Kay, and the designers of the weapons, Dave Walls and David Caig. The founders were professional international or national sport shooters. Accuracy International's sniper rifles are used internationally in military units and police departments.

Accuracy International went into liquidation in 2005, and was bought by a British consortium including the original design team of Dave Walls and David Caig.

Management 
As of 2014, the company was equally owned by two directors, Dave Walls and Tom Irwin along with Paul Bagshaw. David Caig remains in the business as a consultant.

Production 
The rifles are hand-built.

Accuracy International introduced their new AS50 .50 BMG calibre semi-automatic rifle at the 2005 SHOT Show in Las Vegas and their new AX Series at the 2010 Shot Show in Las Vegas.

The UK government announced in March 2008 the award of an £11 million contract to produce rifles for the British Army.

Distribution
Accuracy International's distribution in United States is managed by the American division of AI, Accuracy International USA. There are only two distributors of Accuracy International in the United States, Eurooptic and Mile High Shooting.

Magazine types 
Different Accuracy International rifle models come with a variety of proprietary magazines.

AICS-style magazine 
The "AICS-style" short action box magazine was originally manufactured for the Accuracy International Chassis System, but can now be found on several production rifles, such as the SIG Sauer CROSS, the Ruger Gunsite Scout, Ruger Precision Rifle, some Ruger American Rifle models and some new production models by Remington (Model 700 PCR, 700 Tactical Chassis, 700 Magpul, and 700 Magpul Enhanced).  AICS-style magazines can also be found on many custom rifles, and aftermarket conversion kits (known as "bottom metals") are available for several different rifle models and are made by several different manufacturers.  Many conversion kits require fitting ("inletting") by a gunsmith.

In addition to Accuracy International, there are now aftermarket manufacturers offering AICS-style magazines, such as Magpul, Accu-Mag and Modular Driven Technologies (MDT).

Examples of other magazine designs include the STANAG magazine (for 5.56×45mm NATO length cartridges) and SR-25 pattern magazine (for 7.62×51mm NATO length cartridges).

See also 
 Accuracy International Arctic Warfare
 Accuracy International AWM
 Accuracy International AS50
 Accuracy International AW50
 Accuracy International AXMC

References

External links 

 
 The AS50 at Modern Firearms

Manufacturing companies established in 1978
Firearm manufacturers of the United Kingdom
Companies based in Portsmouth